Jessy Moulin (born 13 January 1986) is a French professional footballer who plays as a goalkeeper for Ligue 1 club Troyes.

Moulin played for Saint-Étienne until 2021. He joined the club's reserve team in 2005, joining the first team in 2007 and being sent on loan spells to Arles, Fréjus Saint-Raphaël, and Clermont in the process. He joined Troyes in 2021.

Honours
Saint-Étienne
 Coupe de France runner-up: 2019–20

References

External links
 

1986 births
Living people
Sportspeople from Valence, Drôme
French footballers
Footballers from Auvergne-Rhône-Alpes
Association football goalkeepers
Ligue 1 players
Ligue 2 players
Championnat National players
Championnat National 2 players
Championnat National 3 players
AS Saint-Étienne players
AC Arlésien players
ÉFC Fréjus Saint-Raphaël players
Clermont Foot players
ES Troyes AC players